Oshana is one of the fourteen regions of Namibia, its capital is Oshakati. The towns of Oshakati, Ongwediva and Ondangwa, all situated with this region, form an urban cluster with the second largest population concentration in Namibia after the capital Windhoek. , Oshana had 113,112 registered voters.

Geography

Oshana is one of only three regions without either a coastline or a foreign border.  It borders the following regions:
Ohangwena - north
Oshikoto - east
Kunene - south
Omusati - west

The name Oshana describes the most prominent landscape feature in the area, namely the shallow, seasonally inundated depressions which underpin the local agro ecological system. Although communications are hindered during the rainy season, the fish which breed in the oshanas provide an important source of dietary protein.

Economy and infrastructure
The Oshakati-Ongwediva-Ondangwa complex has experienced dramatic urban growth in recent years and forms an important commercial and potential industrial focus. As a whole, it forms the second largest population concentration in Namibia after Windhoek, but it still lacks basic infrastructure and most of the services and facilities normally found in urban areas of this size. The majority of businesses in northern Namibia are located here, providing a significant amount of employment. However, urbanisation is continuing within the region.

The area is far more densely populated in north, which is linked to Tsumeb and other regions by the high quality trunk road; this also facilitates the transport of freight. However, a significant improvement in the rest of the road network and in other forms of telecommunications are required. Oshakati and Ondangwa have airstrips which handle medium-sized airplanes in daylight only and provision can be made for both passengers and airfreight. The establishment of a control tower may contribute to the improvement of all-weather air and transport. Oshakati has a state hospital which supports a number of clinics. Although both primary and secondary schools are spread across the region, they are few relative to the amount of inhabitants of the region.

Omahangu is the principal staple crop grown in Oshana, which is suitable for agriculture. However, the soil is exhausted over much of the central area and requires substantial fertilisation in order to maintain reasonable productivity. Cattle also do well here and herds are extensive. The southern portion of Oshana is an extensive savannah plain stretching as far as the Etosha Pan, but the generally high salinity of soil and water render it unsuitable for grazing or cultivation.

According to the 2012 Namibia Labour Force Survey, unemployment in Oshana Region is 24.5%. Oshana has 137 schools with a total of 50,740 pupils.

Politics

The region comprises eleven constituencies:
 Okaku
 Okatana
 Okatyali
 Ompundja
 Ondangwa Rural
 Ondangwa Urban
 Ongwediva
 Oshakati East
 Oshakati West
 Uukwiyu
 Uuvudhiya

Regional elections
Electorally, Oshana region is consistently dominated by the South West Africa People's Organization (SWAPO). The 2015 local and regional elections saw SWAPO obtain 92% of the total votes (2010: 91.0) and win uncontested seven of the eleven Oshana constituencies. The remaining four constituencies SWAPO won by a landslide, with results well over 90%. Although SWAPO's support dropped to 65.4% of the total votes in the 2020 regional election it again won in all constituencies. Only in Ondangwa Urban did the upstart Independent Patriots for Change (IPC), an opposition party formed in August 2020, come close to a council seat.

Governors
Clemens Kashuupulwa was appointed governor of Oshana in 1998. He was reappointed in 2015 following the 2014 election and served in this position until November 2018. In March 2019 Elia Irimari was appointed to succeed him.

Gallery

References

External links

 
Oshiwambo words and phrases
Regions of Namibia
States and territories established in 1992
1992 establishments in Namibia